Denmark Sevilla popularly known as DM Sevilla (born 29 January 1987) is a Filipino actor and dancer.

Sevilla was born in Santa Maria, Bulacan, Philippines.  He is one of the final top 5 members of Star Circle Quest batch 2004 together with Erich Gonzales. He is currently working on ABS-CBN and best known for his as Romeo in Princess and I.

Filmography

Television

Others

 Eat Bulaga! (GMA 7) - as Mr. Pogi Grand finalist [2004]
 ASAP Fanatics (ABS-CBN) - as himself/co-host [2004-05]
 TEENS (TV-5) - as a host [2007-08]

References

External links
 

Filipino male television actors
1987 births
Living people
People from Santa Maria, Bulacan
Male actors from Bulacan
Star Circle Quest participants
ABS-CBN personalities
Star Magic